This is a list of the main career statistics of Greek professional tennis player Stefanos Tsitsipas. All statistics are according to the ATP Tour and ITF websites.

Performance timelines

Singles
Current through the 2023 Indian Wells Masters.

Note: Tsitsipas received walkovers in the second round of the 2020 Australian Open and the fourth round of the 2021 Australian Open, which do not officially count as wins.

Doubles

Significant finals

Grand Slam finals

Singles: 2 (2 runner-ups)

Year-end championship

Singles: 1 (1 title)

ATP Masters 1000 finals

Singles: 6 (2 titles, 4 runner-ups)

Doubles: 1 (1 runner-up)

ATP Tour career finals

Singles: 25 (9 titles, 16 runner-ups)

Doubles: 2 (1 title, 1 runner-up)

ATP Next Generation finals

Singles: 1 (1 title)

ATP Challenger and ITF Futures finals

Singles: 11 (6 titles, 5 runner-ups)

Doubles: 9 (6 titles, 3 runner-ups)

Source: ITF player profile

ITF Junior Circuit

Singles: 4 (2 titles, 2 runner-ups)

Junior Grand Slam finals

Doubles: 1 (1 title)

Junior National representation

National and international representation

Team competitions finals: 3 (2 titles, 1 runner-up)

Laver Cup: 3 (2 titles, 1 runner-up)

   indicates the result of the Laver Cup match followed by the score, date, place of event and the court surface.

Wins: 2

Davis Cup

ATP Cup

United Cup

Hopman Cup

   indicates the result of the Hopman Cup match followed by the score, date, place of event, competition phase, and the court surface.

Tennis Leagues

League finals: 1 (1 runner-up)

Coaches

Career coaches:
 Apostolos Tsitsipas (2004–present) Giorgos Spiliopoulos (2004–2006) Giorgos Fountoukos (Current mentor) (2006–present)/  Patrick Mouratoglou (2015–present)  Mark Philippoussis (2022–present) Frédéric Lefebvre (Fitness Coach) (2017–present)

National Team coaches/ captains:
 Dimitris Chatzinikolaou (Davis Cup) (2019–present) Apostolos Tsitsipas (Davis Cup & ATP Cup) (2019–present)

International Team coaches/ captains:
 Björn Borg (Captain) (Laver Cup) (2019, 2021, 2022) Thomas Enqvist (Vice-captain) (Laver Cup) (2019, 2021, 2022)

Best Grand Slam results details

Record against other players

Record against players ranked in the top 10
Tsitsipas' match record against players who have been ranked in the top 10, with those who are active in boldface. Only ATP Tour main draw matches are considered.

!class="unsortable"|
|-bgcolor=efefef class="sortbottom"
|align=left|Number 1 ranked players||colspan=8|
|-

|

|

|

|

|

|

|-bgcolor=efefef class="sortbottom"
|align=left|Number 2 ranked players||colspan=8|
|-

|

|
|-bgcolor=efefef class="sortbottom"
|align=left|Number 3 ranked players||colspan=8|
|-

|

|

|

|

|

	
|
|-bgcolor=efefef class="sortbottom"
|align=left|Number 4 ranked players||colspan=8|
|-

|
|-bgcolor=efefef class="sortbottom"
|align=left|Number 5 ranked players||colspan=8|
|-

|

|

|

|
|-bgcolor=efefef class="sortbottom"
|align=left|Number 6 ranked players||colspan=8|
|-

|

|

|

|

|-bgcolor=efefef class="sortbottom"
|align=left|Number 7 ranked players||colspan=8|
|-

|

|

|

|
|-bgcolor=efefef class="sortbottom"
|align=left|Number 8 ranked players||colspan=8|
|-

|

|

|

|

|

|

|-bgcolor=efefef class="sortbottom"
|align=left|Number 9 ranked players||colspan=8|
|-

|

|

|

|

|

|-bgcolor=efefef class="sortbottom"
|align=left|Number 10 ranked players||colspan=8|
|-

|

|

|

|

Record against players ranked No. 11–20
Tsitsipas's record against players who have been ranked world No. 11–20.

Active players are in boldface. 

 Alex de Minaur 8–0
 Pablo Cuevas 4–0
 Philipp Kohlschreiber 4–0
 Benoît Paire 4–1
 Albert Ramos Viñolas 3–0
 Nikoloz Basilashvili 3–1
 Cristian Garín 2–0
 Frances Tiafoe 2–3
 Kyle Edmund 1–0
 Aslan Karatsev 1–0
 Florian Mayer 1–0
 Viktor Troicki 1–0
 Ivo Karlović 1–1
 Reilly Opelka 1–1
 Borna Ćorić 1–2
 Nick Kyrgios 1–4
 Andreas Seppi 0–1

*Statistics correct as of 25 September 2022.

Wins over top 10 players 
Tsitsipas has a  record against players who were ranked in the top 10 at the time the match was played.

Grand Slam seedings

*

ATP Tour career earnings

* Statistics correct .

Exhibitions and charity matches

Tournament finals

Singles

Matches

Singles

Team competitions

See also 

Greece Davis Cup team
Sport in Greece
ATP Finals appearances
Fastest recorded tennis serves

References

External links
 
 
 

Tsitsipas, Stefanos